Pierluigi Giombini (born 11 December 1956 in Rome) is an Italian songwriter and record producer. He was born in a family of musicians: his father Marcello Giombini was a composer of secular music and film music as well as being interested in electronic music. His grandfather was a music professor who specialized in the oboe and also played in orchestras. Giombini therefore had been introduced at an early age to the classics and progressed to study piano and composition at the conservatory. While he was studying classical music at the Conservatory in Rome, he also listened to 1970s progressive rock groups; Emerson, Lake & Palmer in particular and Wendy Carlos. It was Wendy Carlos' Switched-On Bach records that inspired him to study and create the synth sounds that he later used on his hit records in the 1980s. Even now he still uses hardware and software synths for his current projects such as 'Web'.

He wrote, arranged and produced international successes such as "I Like Chopin" for Gazebo, "Dolce Vita" for Ryan Paris, and "Lovin' Times" for Web, these having hit the top ten charts all over the world and totalling over twelve million records sold.

Giombini has composed, written, arranged, played keyboards, programmed and produced the main lyrical hooks for his songs.

He has collaborated with numerous singers and lyric writers such as Paul Mazzolini, a former school friend whom he launched into minor stardom through his successful productions, melodies and lyrical concepts.

References

External links
Pierluigi Giombini official website
Discography

1956 births
Living people
Italian musicians
Italian Italo disco musicians
Musicians from Rome
Accademia Nazionale di Santa Cecilia alumni